Pierre G. "The Duffer" Charette (born June 23, 1955) is a Canadian curler from Gatineau, Quebec. He currently coaches the Silvana Tirinzoni rink

Career
Born in Masson, Quebec, Charette has played in thirteen Briers, and was the first curler to have played every position (including alternate) at a Brier. He skipped teams in 1989, 1993 and 2007; played third for Guy Hemmings in 1998 and 1999, played second for Don Westphal in 1997, played lead for Westphal in 1996 and was the alternate for Kevin Adams in 1991, Ted Butler in 1992 and Jean-Michel Ménard in 2013, 2014, 2016 and 2017.

Charette's best performance at the Brier was the two years he played for Hemmings, where they lost in the Brier final on both occasions.

Charette had to qualify for the 2007 Tim Hortons Brier by defeating defending Brier champion Jean-Michel Ménard in the Quebec final 12-8.

Presently Charette is a golf professional at the Club de golf Royal Papineau.

In 2001, Charette played third for Peter Corner in the Ontario provincial championships, but they finished 3-6.

After the 2010-11 curling season ended, Serge Reid's team announced in a tweet that Charette would be joining their rink as skip and would throw lead stones. He played with them for one season before forming a new team with Richard Faguy, Louis Biron and Maurice Cayouette.

Personal life
Charette is employed as the president of GolfXtra. He has two children.

References

External links
 

1955 births
Curlers from Quebec
French Quebecers
Living people
Sportspeople from Gatineau
Canadian male curlers
Canadian curling coaches
Curlers from Ottawa